Salitre Magico is an amusement park located in Bogotá, Colombia inside the territory of the Parque el Salitre. Currently it has 39 mechanical attractions such as roller coasters, bumping cars, and the unique "Castillo del Terror" (Castle of Horror). It was one of the most important and classic amusement parks of the city, as well as the largest, among some others such as the Mundo Aventura and the Cici Aquapark.

History
Inaugurated in 1973 under the name of "Parque El Salitre", and located between the 68th Avenue and the 63rd Street, near the Parque Simon Bolivar in Bogotá. It was then considered as one of the most modern parks on Latin America. Some years later, the park was closed to the public in 1999, in order to be remodeled.

Its reinauguration took place in December 2000, under a new name "Salitre Mágico" and under the Mexican firm CIE, with a total of 29 rides located all over the park, among these there was a roller coaster nicknamed "the Screw" due to its helicoidal form which was imported from the United States and reassembled in Bogotá; some other new attractions such as a giant Chicago Wheel called the "Rueda Millenium" (Millennium Wheel) with a total height of 40 m which offers a panoramic view of the city. The Salitre Magico also offers aquatic attractions and a wide variety of mechanical attractions and shows for children and the whole family. Close to the Salitre Magico, a brother park was inaugurated, the Cici Aquapark, which offers aquatic attractions including a sea waves simulator and several sledges. Both parks are currently part of the Mexican emporium Corporacion Interamericana de Entretenimiento.

Rides

Among the wide variety of rides, the park offers entertainment for children with attractions such as the Carousel, Flying Swings, the Top Spin (Apocalipsis) and mini-Wheel; some other of high impact such as the three Roller coasters, the Tornado, the Double Loop and the Screw which counts with free falls up from 15 m height and a total round of 500 m.

References

 http://www.lafm.com.co/bogotá-y-cundinamarca/noticias/denuncian-caso-discriminación

External links 
  

1973 establishments in Colombia

2000 establishments in Colombia
Amusement parks in Colombia
Buildings and structures in Bogotá